Damon Sansum (born 18 February 1987) is a British taekwondo athlete. He won the silver medal at the 2015 World Taekwondo Championships in the Men's welterweight category.

In 2017 he competed again in the world championships, getting a bronze medal on the same Men's welterweight category.

References 

Living people
British male taekwondo practitioners
1987 births
European Taekwondo Championships medalists
World Taekwondo Championships medalists
21st-century British people